This is the discography of Dutch DJ Ben Liebrand.

Singles

Remixes and megamixes in charts

Other productions
 Alf - "Stuck on Earth"
 Forrest - "Rock the Boat"
 ISCO - "Funkytown"
 MDMC - "How About It"
 Lafleur - "Boogie Nights"
 Heatwave - "Grooveline"

Additional production and remixes
 Rick Astley - "Never Gonna Give You Up"
 Salt-N-Pepa - "Let's Talk About Sex"
 Salt-N-Pepa - "Whatta Man"
 Salt-N-Pepa - "Expression"
 Salt-N-Pepa - "Do You Really Want Me"
 Salt-N-Pepa - "Respect Yourself"
 Fox the Fox - "Precious Little Diamond" (Special Remix) (1984 on CBS Records)
 Fun Fun - "Happy Station"
 Hot Chocolate - "You Sexy Thing"
 Hot Chocolate - "Every 1's a Winner"
 Tavares - "Heaven Must Be Missing an Angel"
 Tavares - "Don't Take Away the Music"
 Tavares - "It Only Takes a Minute"
 Tavares - "More Than a Woman"
 Jan Hammer - "Crockett's Theme"
 Nina Hagen - "New York New York"
 Grace Jones - "Victor Should Have Been a Jazz Musician"
 Bill Withers - "Lovely Day" (Sunshine Mix) (1988)
 Bill Withers - "Harlem"
 Bill Withers - "Lovely Day"
 Frankie Valli & the Four Seasons - "December 1963 (Oh What A Night)" (1988 and re-released in 1992)
 Taja Sevelle - "Love Is Contagious" (1988)
 Dimples D. - "Sucker DJ" (1991)
 Sting - "Englishman in New York" (1990)
 Crystal Waters - "Gypsy Woman (She's Homeless)" (Guitar Mix) (1992)
 Tiga - "Sunglasses at Night"
 The Flirts - "Passion"
 Sugarhill Gang - "Rappers Delight"
 Ryan Paris - "Dolce Vita"
 Madonna - "Open Your Heart" (1987)
 Wet Wet Wet - "Sweet Surrender" (1989)
 INXS - "Need You Tonight" (1988)
 The Trammps - "Disco Inferno"
 Armin van Buuren - "Communication"
 Phil Collins - "In the Air Tonight"
 Genesis - "I Can't Dance"
 Hall & Oates - "I Can't Go for That"
 Ram Jam - "Black Betty"
 Grandmaster Flash & The Furious 5 - "White Lines"
 Natalie Cole - "This Will Be"
 Alexander O'Neal - "Criticize" (1988)
 Sister Sledge - "Lost in Music"
 Mysterious Art - "The Omen" (1989)
 Michael Jackson - "Liberian Girl"
 Michael Jackson - "Bad"
 Michael Jackson - "Smooth Criminal"
 Armin van Buuren - "Old Skool"

Megamixes
 Grandmix 83
 Grandmix 84
 Grandmix 85
 Dance Classics the Mix
 Grandmix 86
 Grandmix 87
 Grandmix 88
 Grandmix 89
 Grandmix 90
 Grandmix 91
 Grandmix 92
 Grandmix 2000
 Popmix
 Grandmix Summer Edition
 Grandmix 2001
 Grandmix Millennium Edition
 Grandmix Disco Edition
 Grandmix Disco Edition 2
 Grandmix 90's Edition
 Grandmix 90's Edition 2
 Grandmix Nouveau Disco
 Grandmix 2002
 Grandmix 2003
 Grandmix 2004
 Grandmix 2005
 Grandmix 2006
 Grandmix 2007
 Grandmix 2008
 Jaarmix 2007
 Jaarmix 2008
 Grandmix 2009
 Grandmix 2010
 Grandmix 2011
 Intergalactic Disco Funk 1
 Intergalactic Disco Funk 2
 Intergalactic Disco Funk 3
 Grandmix 2012

References

Discographies of Dutch artists